Fire Fighters is a silent short film, the second entry in Hal Roach's Our Gang (Little Rascals) series. Directed by Robert F. McGowan and Tom McNamara, the two-reel short was released to theaters in October 1922 by Pathé.

Plot
The kids organize their own fire department and unwittingly thwart a group of bootleggers.

Production notes
There are a total of ten children in the fire department: two girls and seven boys. There are three regular actors — Ernie Morrison, Allen Hoskins and Jackie Condon —and one regular actress, Peggy Cartwright. There are also four additional boys and one other girl.  There is some conflict concerning the identity of these last five child actors and actress.
This Our Gang entry marks the debut of Allen Hoskins, who portrayed the character "Farina" until 1931, making him the longest tenured member of the gang.
Plot elements of Fire Fighters were reused in The Fourth Alarm (1926) and Hook and Ladder (1932).
When television rights for the original silent Pathé Our Gang comedies were sold to National Telepix and other distributors, several episodes were retitled. This film was released as The Mischief Makers in 1960 under the title Little Firemen: two-thirds of the original film was included. The film was also released as an episode of the series Those Lovable Scallawags With Their Gangs under the title Fire Works. Among the scenes deleted  were the opening animal sequences; most of the inter-titles were left intact.

Cast

The Gang
Ernie Morrison as Booker T. Bacon
Jackie Condon as Roosevelt "Roosie" Pershing Smith
Peggy Cartwright as Peggy
George "Freckles" Warde as Freckles
Richard Billings as Jackie's older brother
Elmo Billings as Our Gang member
 Kenneth Johnson as Other Our Gang member
 Betsy Ann Hisle as Mabel 'Mike'
 Dinah the Mule as Lilly

Additional cast
 Allen Hoskins as Farina
 Joseph Morrison as Booker T.'s dad
 George Rowe as The bootlegger
 Charles Stevenson as The police officer

See also
 Our Gang filmography

References

External links 
 
 
 Fire Fighters movie at the Prelinger Archive

1922 films
1922 comedy films
American black-and-white films
Films directed by Robert F. McGowan
Hal Roach Studios short films
American silent short films
Our Gang films
1922 short films
1920s American films
Silent American comedy films